Xeko is an out-of-print collectible card game revolving around endangered species. It was launched on Earthday 2006. It won the Creative Child Magazine 2006 Toy of the Year Award and the National Parenting Center's Seal of Approval in its first year.  Four "Mission" sets have been released. Mission: Costa Rica and Mission: Madagascar, based on biodiversity hotspots were released first. Mission: Indonesia, was released in 2007, with the final release, Mission: China, was released July 19, 2008.  A total of thirty more missions were planned but never developed.

Xeko was invented by Amy Tucker and designed by Tyler Bielman, a Seattle-based game designer.  "Xeko is dedicated to a bright green future and preserving some of our planet's greatest riches".

In addition to attempting to raise awareness using the game itself, Matter Group (the company that produces Xeko) has the following programs and processes in place:
 Xeko Green Stars Program accepts recycled booster pack wrappers in exchange for points in Club Xeko.
 4% of Xeko vame net sales are donated to Conservation International.
 All Xeko game materials and packaging are made with recycled and recyclable materials.
 Only eco-friendly inks that are kinder to the environment are used in production.

In 2009, Xeko was sold to an Atlanta game studio, Good Egg Studios, and merged with the Gaming for Good virtual world. As of September 2010, the official Xeko website was closed and no reopening date has been posted. Reports have surfaced that Good Egg Studios has gone out of business and Xeko was acquired by Oomba. Oomba later raised $250,000 from Kickstarter, there has been no such implementation and the project appears to have been dropped.

Artwork
As with many trading card games, the card art is drawn by a variety of different artists with different styles.  The card artists include Michel Gagné, Travis Kotzebue, BJ Nartker, and others.  Six limited print sketch cards are also available and can only be obtained in Starter Decks.

Card types
The following four types of cards are featured in the game:

 Species - A species card can be any type of animal, insect, or plant.
 Boost - A boost card is an instant energy modifier used during turf wars.
 Xeko - A Xeko card is an environment modifier that can affect any aspect of the game.
 Hotspot - A hotspot card is only used as a building block to start the game.

Each card is also assigned a rarity rating of one to four, one being the most common and four being the rarest. In the Xeko nomenclature, these are Common, Rare, Endangered, and Vanishing. The rarity of a card can be checked at a glance by counting the dots the bottom right-hand corner.

Next to the rarity rating is a two-letter abbreviation that designates the edition in which the card was released, as follows:

MM = Madagascar, CR = Costa Rica, IN = Indonesia, CH = China

Gameplay
Xeko centered on biodiversity hot spots representing actual location around the globe. Using the cards drawn throughout the game, players created an ecosystem interconnected by different colors found around the rim of the cards. Each card had a value in "eco-points," the game's scoring system. Turns were representative of a Night - Day cycle, in which each player adds elements to the overall ecosystem through new species or other effect cards. This adding of species triggered a turf war in which the two connected species "battle". In most cases neither of the species died. Instead, the loser of the turf war had to discard cards from the top of their deck. The game ended when one play's deck had no more cards, and the winner was chosen by whoever possesses the most eco-points at the end of the game.

Animals and plants of Mission: Madagascar

Animals and plants of Mission: Costa Rica

Animals and plants of Mission: Indonesia

Animals and plants of Mission: China

External links
  (archived)
 Club Xeko (archived)
 Xeko Aye Aye Commercial
 Site Closure Report

References

 Mission: Madagascar - Complete Card List
 Mission: Costa Rica - Complete Card List
 Mission: Indonesia - Complete Card List
 Mission: China - Complete Card List
 Club Xeko
 Xeko Greenworks

Card games introduced in 2006
Collectible card games